Jérôme Proulx (April 28, 1930 – August 26, 2021) was a nationalist politician in Quebec, Canada and a member of the National Assembly of Quebec from 1966 to 1970 and from 1976 to 1985.

He was born on April 28, 1930 in Saint-Jérôme, Quebec and made a career in education.

Proulx won a seat in the 1966 Quebec election in the district of Saint-Jean as a member of the Union Nationale.  In November 1969 he left his party to protest the passage of Bill 63, a controversial language law, sitting first as an independent, and then fifteen days later joining the Parti Québécois (PQ).  He ran as a PQ candidate in 1970 and 1973, but lost both times.

He was returned to the legislature in 1976 and won re-election in 1981.  During the Parti Québécois Crisis of 1984, Proulx temporarily sat as an Independent to promote a more proactive approach concerning the promotion of sovereignty. Proulx lost re-election in 1985.

He authored Un panier de crabes in 1971.

References 

1930 births
2021 deaths
French Quebecers
Parti Québécois MNAs
People from Saint-Jérôme
Union Nationale (Quebec) MNAs